Bharat Awasthy (born 6 December 1938) is an Indian former cricketer. He played first-class cricket for Delhi and Services.

See also
 List of Delhi cricketers

References

External links
 

1938 births
Living people
Indian cricketers
Delhi cricketers
Services cricketers
Cricketers from Delhi